John Hall is the self-titled second album by John Hall released in 1978. It was Hall's first solo album after leaving Orleans due to internal stresses and disagreements over material and musical direction.

Track listing

Personnel
John Hall - lead vocals, keyboards, guitar
Steve Gadd - drums (2 to 4, 6 to 8)
Ed Greene - drums (1, 5)
Wilton Felder - bass (1 to 5, 7)
David Hungate - bass (6, 8)
Joe Sample - keyboards (1 to 5)
Bill Payne - keyboards (6, 8)
Sonny Burke - keyboards (7)
David Paich - keyboards (8)
Milt Holland - percussion (2, 4)
Joel Tepp - harmonica (3)
Michael Brecker - saxophone (3, 7)
David Sanborn - saxophone (7)

Production
Producer: John Hall, Charles Plotkin
Engineers: Val Garay
Photography: David Alexander

External links

References

1978 albums
Asylum Records albums